Louis John "Luke" Urban (March 22, 1898 – December 7, 1980) was an American multi-sport athlete and coach. He played four seasons of professional American football in the National Football League and two years of Major League Baseball with the Boston Braves. Urban was also a college football coach, a college and high school basketball coach, and a minor league baseball manager.

Playing career

College
Urban played football, basketball, baseball and ice hockey for the Boston College Eagles. He was a captain for the football, basketball and baseball teams. He was a member of the 1920 College Football All-America Team.

Football
Urban played end for the Buffalo All-Americans from 1921 to 1924. He was named to the Buffalo Evening News All-APFA Team in 1921, George Halas' All-NFL Team in 1922, and the Collyers Eye Magazine and Canton Daily News All-NFL Team in 1923.

Baseball
Urban signed with the New York Yankees and played for their minor league teams in Buffalo and Columbus. He made the Major Leagues in 1927 with the Boston Braves. He appeared in 35 games for the Braves that season.  Urban refused to report to spring training in 1928 as part of a contract holdout. He eventually reported to camp late. On June 22, 1928, he was traded with Jimmy Cooney and Johnny Werts for Bonnie Hollingsworth. He played for Buffalo from 1928 to 1930 and the Springfield Ponies in 1931, and the Hartford Senators from 1931 to 1932.

Basketball
Urban played basketball for Worcester Five of the Inter-State Basketball League in 1921.

Coaching career
Urban served as Boston College's head basketball coach during his sophomore, junior and senior seasons.

Following his graduation, Urban was offered the position of head football coach at Creighton University, but turned down the offer in order to play professional football. From 1921 to 1930, he was the head basketball and football coach at Canisius College. His football teams had a record of 46–27–7 record, with of his eight clubs having a record of .500 or better. He was the school's winningest football coach until he was passed by Tom Hersey in 1990.

Urban was the head basketball coach at Durfee High School in Fall River, Massachusetts from 1940 to 1960. He had a 247–91 record with the Hilltoppers and won two New England championships.

Urban was the manager of the Fall River Indians of the New England League from 1948 to 1950.

Honors
Urban was inducted into the MBCA Hall of Fame in 1965, the Boston College Varsity Club Athletic Hall of Fame in 1970 and the Canisius College Athletics Hall of Fame in 1976. Durfee High's gymnasium was named the Luke Urban Field House in honor of Urban.

Head coaching record

College football

College basketball

References

External links
 
 
 

1898 births
1980 deaths
All-American college football players
American football ends
American men's basketball coaches
American men's basketball players
American men's ice hockey goaltenders
Baseball players from Massachusetts
Basketball coaches from Massachusetts
Basketball players from Massachusetts
Boston Braves players
Boston College Eagles football players
Boston College Eagles baseball players
Boston College Eagles men's basketball players
Boston College Eagles men's ice hockey players
Buffalo All-Americans players
Buffalo Bisons (minor league) players
Buffalo Bisons (NFL) players
Canisius Golden Griffins football coaches
Canisius Golden Griffins men's basketball coaches
Coaches of American football from Massachusetts
College men's basketball head coaches in the United States
Columbus Senators players
High school basketball coaches in Massachusetts
Ice hockey players from Massachusetts
Major League Baseball catchers
Minor league baseball managers
Players of American football from Massachusetts
Sportspeople from Fall River, Massachusetts
Springfield Ponies players
Toledo Mud Hens players